Borredà is a municipality in the comarca of the Berguedà in Catalonia, Spain. It is situated in the upper valley of the Margençol river in the east of the comarca. There are several notable houses from the 17th and 18th centuries. The Romanesque church of Sant Sadurní de Rotgers, a protected historico-artistic monument, can be reached by a mountain track. The village is served by the C-149 road between Berga and Sant Quirze de Besora. The municipality surrounds an exclave of Les Llosses.

Demography

References

 Panareda Clopés, Josep Maria; Rios Calvet, Jaume; Rabella Vives, Josep Maria (1989). Guia de Catalunya, Barcelona: Caixa de Catalunya.  (Spanish).  (Catalan).

External links 
Official website 
 Government data pages 

Municipalities in Berguedà
Populated places in Berguedà